Lisa Nippgen (born 2 April 1997) is a German sprinter. She competed in the women's 100 metres at the 2017 European Athletics U23 Championships. She qualified in the women's 4 × 100 metres relay event at the 2020 Summer Olympics held in Tokyo, Japan.

Education
She attended Ludwigshafen University of Applied Sciences, and is currently a student of corporate law at the University of Mannheim.

References

External links

1997 births
Living people
German female sprinters
Place of birth missing (living people)